The Burmese Buddhist Temple (also known as Maha Sasana Ramsi;) is the oldest Theravada institution and the only Burmese Buddhist temple of its kind in Singapore. Founded in 1875, the temple moved from its original Kinta Road premises to Tai Gin Road off Ah Hood Road in Novena in 1988. The temple houses the largest pure white marble statue of the Buddha outside Myanmar, and has become a religious landmark for Burmese and Singaporean devotees to make merit and take part in merit-sharing activities alike.

History
The Burmese Buddhist Temple (BBT) was founded by a Burmese man named U Thar Hnin, also known as Tang Sooay Chin, at 17 Kinta Road (off Serangoon Road) in 1875. In 1878, U Thar Hnin donated the temple to U Kyaw Gaung (also known as Khoo Teogou), a traditional Burmese physician. The temple houses the largest pure white marble statue of the Buddha outside of Myanmar. It is also the only Burmese Buddhist temple built outside of Myanmar in the traditional Burmese architectural style.

A mission
U Kyaw Gaung, also known as Khoo Teogou, was born in Mandalay, Myanmar in 1866. He arrived in Singapore at an early age and was later joined by his wife Daw Khin Mae and their three children. Coming from a land of great Buddhist influence, it was U Kyaw Gaung's ambition to introduce Theravada Buddhism in Singapore.

In 1907, he was elected as trustee of the temple. While administering the temple, he dreamt of acquiring a sizable marble Buddha statue such as those seen in Myanmar. Undaunted by limited funds, U Kyaw Gaung pledged to carry out the mammoth task. He raised funds from his own earnings and public donations. Sagyin Hill was famous in Myanmar for its superior quality marble. The stone was bought for Rs1,200 and delivered to Mandalay, a city reputed for its skilled craftsmanship.

Despite the lack of modern transportation and heavy machinery at that time, and the numerous challenges he faced during the arduous  journey over land and sea, U Kyaw Gaung successfully transported the completed Buddha statue to Singapore in 1921 intact with assistance from the late Aw Boon Par of Tiger Balm fame. The marble statue was at first housed in a shed known as "Buddha Wehara". In 1925, it was moved to Kinta Road where it was housed in a private chamber. This chamber became a shrine hall where devotees paid homage to the Buddha. In 1935, U Kyaw Gaung died at the age of 69 and the temple was partially converted into a private residence. U Kyaw Gaung's children looked after the temple during the Japanese Occupation and the post-war period.

Relocation
In 1981, the family of the late U Kyaw Gaung was served a notice by the Urban Redevelopment Authority to vacate their house. Following the Government's resettlement programme, the temple was relocated on Tai Gin Road in 1988 where it stands today. Under the guidance of the temple's Spiritual Advisor, Sayadaw U Pannavamsa, together with the combined efforts of the resident monks, members of the public, and well-wishers, the new temple building was officially opened in 1991. The temple has intricate Burmese architectural style with teak wood carvings that were donated by the Tripitaka Nikaya Main Ministrative Body (Ti Ni) of Myanmar.

Bodhi tree
A Bodhi tree (Ficus religiosa), can be seen in the compound of the temple. It was grown from a seed from its parent tree at Mangala Vihara Buddhist Temple at 30 Jalan Eunos, Singapore. A Buddha image is placed under the Bodhi tree to remind people that Sakyamuni Buddha attained Enlightenment while meditating under a Bo tree at Bodh Gaya, in the Ganges valley, around 600 . It was nurtured by the late Madam Boey, a devotee of Mangala Vihara. Its parent tree was a sapling brought to Singapore from Sri Lanka by Venerable Mahinda, the son of Ashoka the Great of India, which was a descendant of the Bodhi tree under which the Buddha attained Enlightenment.

Activities and management

The temple's resident Sangha consists of four Burmese monks headed by Sayadaw U Pannavamsa while the management of the temple's operations is run by a management committee that consists of devotees from the Burmese and Singaporean communities. The monks conduct regular Dhamma talks, chants and blessings for devotees all year round. Its annual calendar of events includes New Year special offering to the Sangha; Chinese New Year's Eve chanting; observances of the Water Festival (Thin Gyan) and Vesak Day; the Vassa (Rain Retreat) offering of robes; the Kathina celebration; and a novitiate programme. Weekly activities include Dharma and Abhidhamma classes, puja, meditation and Dhammacakka chanting.

See also
 Sayadaw U Paññāvaṃsa
 Wat Ananda Metyarama Thai Buddhist Temple
 Palelai Buddhist Temple
 Sri Lankaramaya Buddhist Temple
 Ti-Sarana Buddhist Association
 Bodhiraja Buddhist Society
 Vipassana Meditation Centre
 Buddhism in Singapore

References

Bibliography
Burmese Buddhist Temple Newsletter, vol. 10, no. 1, July 1996.
Burmese Buddhist Temple Newsletter, vol. 21, no. 2, January 2007.

External links

Maha Sasanaramsi Burmese Buddhist Temple 
Burmese Buddhist temple Singapore

 

1875 establishments in the British Empire
19th-century Buddhist temples
20th-century Buddhist temples
Buddhist temples in Singapore
Burmese diaspora in Asia
Novena, Singapore
Overseas Burmese Buddhist temples
Religious buildings and structures completed in 1875
Religious buildings and structures completed in 1991
Tourist attractions in Singapore
19th-century architecture in Singapore
20th-century architecture in Singapore